Steamships named Ryazan include:

 SS Ryazan, a Russian cargo liner in service 1909–14 that was captured by Imperial Germany and refitted as merchant raider  before being scuttled in 1916 at Guam
 , a Sovitet Hansa A Type cargo ship in service 1946–79